The women's pursuit competitions in biathlon of the 2011 IPC Biathlon and Cross-Country Skiing World Championships were held on April 2, 2011.

Medals

Results

Sitting 
The women's 3 km pursuit, sitting. Skiers compete on a sitski.

Qualification 
09:10 local time

Final 
15:35 local time

Standing 
The women's 3.6 km pursuit, standing.

Qualification

Final

Visually impaired 
The women's 3.6 km pursuit, visually impaired. Skiers with a visual impairment compete with a sighted guide. Dual medals are rewarded.

Qualification

Final

See also
Biathlon World Championships 2011 – Women's pursuit

References

2011 IPC Biathlon and Cross-Country Skiing World Championships Live results, and schedule at ipclive.siwidata.com
WCH - Khanty Mansiysk - Results - Biathlon Pursuit, IPC Nordic Skiing

Pursuit